The Mongolian Chess Championship is currently organized by the Mongolian Chess Federation. The first national championship was held in 1948 and the first women's championship was held in 1954. Bazar Khatanbaatar holds the record for most national championships won, with eight; Tsagaan Battsetseg leads in women's titles with seven.

National championship winners

{| class="sortable wikitable"
!No.
! Year !! Champion
|-
|1
| 1948 || Damdiny Namsrai
|-
|2
| 1950 || Tserendorj Tsedenjav
|-
|3
| 1951 || Idshingiin Yondon-Osor
|-
|4
| 1952 || Jürmediin Dugar
|-
|5
| 1953 || Dashiin Tserendagva
|-
|6
| 1954 || Dashiin Tserendagva
|-
|7
| 1955 || Tseveenii Jügder 
|-
|8
| 1956 || Purev Tumurbator
|-
|9
| 1957 || Dashiin Tserendagva
|-
|10
| 1958 || Sürengiin Möömöö
|-
|11
| 1959 || Naidan Namzhil
|-
|12
| 1961 || Gonchigiin Chalkhaasüren
|-
|13
| 1962 || Sharavyn Pürevjav
|-
|14
| 1964 || Donoy Tsend
|-
|15
| 1965 || Lhamsuren Myagmarsuren
|-
|16
| 1969 || Purev Tumurbator
|-
|17
| 1972 || Tüdeviin Üitümen
|-
|18
| 1974 || Jambaldoo Lhagva
|-
|19
| 1976 || Jambaldoo Lhagva
|-
|20
| 1977 || Jambaldoo Lhagva
|-
|21
| 1978 || Tüdeviin Üitümen
|-
|22
| 1980 || Lhamsuren Myagmarsuren
|-
|23
| 1981 || Lhamsuren Myagmarsuren
|-
|24
| 1982 || Lhamsuren Myagmarsuren
|-
|25
| 1984 || Nyamaa Turbat
|-
|26
| 1985 || Püreviin Jigjidsüren
|-
|27
| 1986 || Tüdeviin Üitümen
|-
|28
| 1988 || Ishdagva Ganbaatar
|-
|29
| 1989 || Nyamaa Tumurhuyag
|-
|30
| 1990 || Jambaldoo Lhagva
|-
|31
| 1991 || Bazar Khatanbaatar
|-
|32
| 1992 || Jambaldoo Lhagva
|-
|33
| 1993 || Dashzeveg Sharavdorj
|-
|34
| 1994 || Bazar Khatanbaatar
|-
|35
| 1995 || Dashzeveg Sharavdorj
|-
|36
| 1996 || Cedendemberel Lhagvasüren
|-
|37
| 1997 || Jambaldoo Lhagva
|-
|38
| 1998 || Bazar Khatanbaatar
|-
|39
| 1999 || Nyamaa Tuvsanaa
|-
|40
| 2000 || Bazar Khatanbaatar
|-
|41
| 2001 || Bazar Khatanbaatar
|-
|42
| 2002 || Dashzeveg Sharavdorj
|-
|43
| 2003 || Bazar Khatanbaatar
|-
|44
| 2004 || Bazar Khatanbaatar
|-
|45
| 2005 || Bazar Khatanbaatar
|-
|46
| 2006 || Tsegmed Batchuluun
|-
|47
| 2007 || Balgan Bayarmandakh
|-
|48
| 2008 || Bayarsaikhan Gundavaa
|-
|49
| 2009 || Bayarsaikhan Gundavaa
|-
|50
| 2010 || Namkhai Battulga
|-
|51
| 2011 || Myagmarsüren Gunbayar
|-
|52
| 2012 || Bayarsaikhan Gundavaa
|-
|53
| 2013 || Bayarsaikhan Gundavaa
|-
|54
| 2014 || Tsegmed Batchuluun
|-
|55
| 2015 || Tsegmed Batchuluun
|-
|56
| 2016 || Munkhgal Gombosuren
|-
|57
| 2017 || Tsegmed Batchuluun
|-
|58
| 2018 || Bilguun Sumiya
|-
|59
| 2019 || Agibileg Uurtsaikh
|-
|60
| 2020 ||
|-
|61
| 2021 ||
|-
|62
| 2022 || Dambasürengiin Batsüren
|}

National women's championship winners

{| class="sortable wikitable"
!No.
! Year !! Champion
|-
|1
| 1954 || Delgermörön Byambaa
|-
|2
| 1956 ||G. Ichinkhorloo
|-
|3
| 1958 || Ganginchugin Hulgana
|-
|4
| 1960 ||Delgermörön Byambaa
|-
|5
| 1962 ||Ganginchugin Hulgana
|-
|6
| 1964 ||Delgermörön Byambaa
|-
|7
| 1965 ||Delgermörön Byambaa
|-
|8
| 1968 || Sandagdorj Khandsüren
|-
|9
| 1972 ||Ganginchugin Hulgana
|-
|10
| 1974 || Purevdorj Büjinlkham
|-
|11
| 1976 ||Ganginchugin Hulgana
|-
|12
| 1977 ||Purevdorj Büjinlkham
|-
|13
| 1978 ||Ganginchugin Hulgana
|-
|14
| 1980 || Gendenjamc Bayarmaa
|-
|15
| 1981 || Shirchin Battsengel
|-
|16
| 1982 ||Ganginchugin Hulgana
|-
|17
| 1984 || Suuri Tungalag
|-
|18
| 1985 ||B. Myagmarsüren
|-
|19
| 1986 ||Suuri Tungalag
|-
|20
| 1988 || Ulziybat Gerelmaa
|-
|21
| 1989 || Tsagaan Battsetseg
|-
|22
| 1990 ||Tsagaan Battsetseg
|-
|23
| 1991 || Genden Oyuunchimeg
|-
|24
| 1992 ||Tsagaan Battsetseg
|-
|25
| 1993 || Nyamaa Tungalag
|-
|26
| 1994 ||Tsagaan Battsetseg
|-
|27
| 1995 ||Tsagaan Battsetseg
|-
|28
| 1996 ||Tsagaan Battsetseg
|-
|29
| 1997 ||Tsagaan Battsetseg
|-
|30
| 1998 ||Dovdon Majigsüren
|-
|31
| 1999 || Tüvshintugs Battsetseg
|-
|32
| 2000 ||Tüvshintugs Battsetseg
|-
|33
| 2001 || Bayanmunkh Ankhchimeg
|-
|34
| 2002 ||Bayanmunkh Ankhchimeg
|-
|35
| 2003 ||Bayanmunkh Ankhchimeg
|-
|36
| 2004 ||Tüvshintugs Battsetseg
|-
|37
| 2005 ||Bayanmunkh Ankhchimeg
|-
|38
| 2006 || Dulamsüren Yanjindulam
|-
|39
| 2007 || Sengeravdan Otgonjargal
|-
|40
| 2008 ||Dulamsüren Yanjindulam
|-
|41
| 2009 || Uuganbayar Lkhamsüren
|-
|42
| 2010 ||Uuganbayar Lkhamsüren
|-
|43
| 2011 || Tüvshintugs Batchimeg
|-
|44
| 2012 ||Dulamsüren Yanjindulam
|-
|45
| 2013 ||Uuganbayar Lkhamsüren
|-
|46
| 2014 || Bayarjargal Bayarmaa
|-
|47
| 2015 ||Bayanmunkh Ankhchimeg
|-
|48
| 2016 || Tüvshintugs Batchimeg
|-
|49
| 2017 || Uurtsaikh Uuriintuya
|-
|50
| 2018 || Batkhuyag Munguntuul
|-
|51
| 2019 || Altantuya Boldbaatar
|-
|52
| 2020 ||
|-
|53
| 2021 ||
|-
|54
| 2022 || Altan-Ulzii Enkhtuul
|}

References

Chess national championships
Women's chess national championships
Chess in Mongolia
Recurring sporting events established in 1948
Recurring sporting events established in 1954
Sports competitions in Mongolia
Chess
Chess
1948 in chess
1954 in chess